Lucien Dury (6 February 1912 – 14 May 2002) was a Luxembourgish politician, journalist, and resistance leader.  He was one of the founders of the Patriotic and Democratic Group, which later became the Democratic Party, of which he was the first President.  He later served as the President of the DP again, from 1959 until 1962.  He sat in the Chamber of Deputies from 1945 until 1951.  He also sat on the communal council of Luxembourg City (1969–77).

During the German occupation in the Second World War, Dury was member of the Letzeburger Vollekslegio'n (LVL), of which he became leader in 1943.  The following year, when the LVL merged into the Unio'n, Dury served as its first President.  After the war, he was involved in founding the Lëtzebuerger Journal daily newspaper.

|-

Members of the Chamber of Deputies (Luxembourg)
Councillors in Luxembourg City
Democratic Party (Luxembourg) politicians
Luxembourgian journalists
Male journalists
Luxembourg Resistance members
1912 births
2002 deaths
People from Luxembourg City
20th-century journalists